Aranui is one of the eastern suburbs of Christchurch. It is a lower socio-economic area. The area is predominantly residential with pockets of light industry. There is a cluster of shops and service facilities at the intersection of Breezes Road and Pages Road.

Etymology
Aranui is a Māori word, with ara meaning path and nui meaning great.

History
Part of the area was previously called Flemington, named after the hairdresser and tobacconist Jubal Fleming (c.1844–1903).  Fleming had a subdivision at the corner of Breezes and Pages Roads, and the tram stop on Breezes Road was informally called Flemington.  The post office was established in 1912 and it was named Aranui by George Kyngdon Burton (c.1859–1957), with that name then applied to the wider area.

Mabel Howard, New Zealand's first woman cabinet minister, was once a resident in the area.

Geography
Aranui is one of the eastern suburbs. Its eastern boundary is the Avon River. Boundary roads are Pages Road in the south, Breezes Road in the west, and Wainoni Road in the north. Bexley is located to the south of Pages Road. Aranui and its neighbouring suburb of Wainoni are often considered together. For example, Wainoni School and Wainoni Park are located in Aranui, and Aranui High School is located in Wainoni. Christchurch City Council publishes a combined community profile for the two suburbs.

Demographics

Aranui had a population of 4,200 at the 2018 New Zealand census, an increase of 423 people (11.2%) since the 2013 census, and a decrease of 60 people (-1.4%) since the 2006 census. There were 1,392 households. There were 2,106 males and 2,091 females, giving a sex ratio of 1.01 males per female. The median age was 30 years (compared with 37.4 years nationally), with 1,101 people (26.2%) aged under 15 years, 999 (23.8%) aged 15 to 29, 1,740 (41.4%) aged 30 to 64, and 354 (8.4%) aged 65 or older.

Ethnicities were 66.1% European/Pākehā, 29.9% Māori, 17.6% Pacific peoples, 3.7% Asian, and 2.0% other ethnicities (totals add to more than 100% since people could identify with multiple ethnicities).

The proportion of people born overseas was 13.4%, compared with 27.1% nationally.

Although some people objected to giving their religion, 53.9% had no religion, 31.8% were Christian, 0.7% were Hindu, 0.1% were Muslim, 0.2% were Buddhist and 4.8% had other religions.

Of those at least 15 years old, 153 (4.9%) people had a bachelor or higher degree, and 1,098 (35.4%) people had no formal qualifications. The median income was $21,300, compared with $31,800 nationally. The employment status of those at least 15 was that 1,224 (39.5%) people were employed full-time, 363 (11.7%) were part-time, and 288 (9.3%) were unemployed.

Education
Aranui is served by the composite school Haeata Community Campus in Wainoni, which was created by a merger of four schools in 2017.

References

Suburbs of Christchurch